"Scarface (Push It to the Limit)" is a song written by record producers Giorgio Moroder and Pete Bellotte and recorded by American musician Paul Engemann. It appeared on the soundtrack for the 1983 motion picture Scarface. The song appears in the film in the montage sequence that demonstrates Tony Montana's rise in wealth and position after he kills Frank Lopez (Robert Loggia) and takes over as the head cocaine trafficker in Miami. In the film, the song appeared in a slightly longer version, featuring a guitar solo during the instrumental break. This version was eventually released on a 12-inch single LP with the guitar solo included.

Composition
The song is composed with a tempo of 156 beats per minute, and is structured in the key of C minor. The drums are made with a Linndrum drum machine.

In other media

It has been employed as a montage song for underdog or dark horse characters, such as in the South Park episode "Up the Down Steroid" (in a techno format remixed by Moroder himself), and in the  It's Always Sunny in Philadelphia episode entitled "Mac's Big Break". A variation of this theme is used in a montage for the American Dad! episode "The Adventures of Twill Ongenbone and His Boy Jabari". Similarly, the 2009-2010 Britvic advert for 'Drench' bottled water features the song while a goldfish remembers its way through a maze. It is also the entrance song for German boxer Ralf Riemer.
 It appears on the 2001 video game Grand Theft Auto III on one of its available in-game radio stations, Flashback FM (Flashback 95.6), along with four other songs from the Scarface film soundtrack.
 It is featured in the official Scarface game, Scarface: The World is Yours.
 It is sampled in the song "Push It" by Rick Ross and remixed by Australian drum and bass artist Phetsta.
 The chorus was performed by Jamey Jasta in Necro's "Push it to the Limit" from the album The Pre-Fix for Death.
 It is often used with the Internet meme Safety Not Guaranteed. 
 The song appeared in The Simpsons season 27 of 2016  1980s-inspired couch gag in the episode "Teenage Mutant Milk-Caused Hurdles".
 The song also appeared in the South Park episode "Up the Down Steroid".
 An homage to the song, called "Break the Rules", written and composed by Simon Viklund, with vocals performed by Phil Bardowell, is used in the game Payday 2, as part of its Scarface DLC Packs.
 The song appeared in It's Always Sunny in Philadelphia'''s season 6 episode "Mac's Big Break".
 It was covered by Finnish heavy metal band Battle Beast on their album Unholy Savior.
 The song can be heard in the animated sitcom American Dad, in the season 8 episode "The Adventures of Twill Ongenbone and His Boy Jabari", during a montage where Roger prepares to run a marathon.
 It was parodied in Sonic Boom, when Sonic and his friends chase the "Bike-Chain Bandit" in the episode "Planes, Trains and Dude-Mobiles". An instrumental of the song also appeared in "Sole Power", within a training compilation featuring Sonic and Tails.
 It was used in the 2nd season, episode 4 of the Netflix series Stranger Things.
 In season 1 episode 2 of the animated series El Cartel de los Burritos, midway through the episode a parody version performed by Los Vikingos del Norte which was renamed "Dealer" can be heard with its musical structure rearranged into typical northern Mexican Narcocorrido style.
 The song is used in 2022 F1 season by Sky Sport F1 Italy during the pause of live coverage of qualifying session between Q2 and Q3 when the commentator Matteo Bobbi explains the track using an onboard fast lap.

 See also 
 "You're the Best", song featured in The Karate Kid "Gonna Fly Now", also known as "Theme from Rocky''"

References

1983 songs
1983 singles
Paul Engemann songs
Songs written by Pete Bellotte
Songs written by Giorgio Moroder
Scarface (1983 film)
MCA Records singles
Dance-rock songs